Takhamalt Airport , also known as Illizi Airport, is an airport serving Illizi, Algeria.

Airlines and destinations

References

External links 
 Google Maps - Illizi
 OurAirports - Takhamalt
 
 

Airports in Algeria
Buildings and structures in Illizi Province